Claudin-1 is a protein that in humans is encoded by the CLDN1 gene. It belongs to the group of claudins.

Function 

Tight junctions represent one mode of cell-to-cell adhesion in epithelial or endothelial cell sheets, forming continuous seals around cells and serving as a physical barrier to prevent solutes and water from passing freely through the paracellular space. These junctions are composed of sets of continuous networking strands in the outwardly facing cytoplasmic leaflet, with complementary grooves in the inwardly facing extracytoplasmic leaflet. The protein encoded by this gene, a member of the claudin family, is an integral membrane protein and a component of tight junction strands. Loss of function mutations result in neonatal ichthyosis-sclerosing cholangitis syndrome.

Interactions 

CLDN1 has been shown to interact with CLDN5 and CLDN3.

References

External links

Further reading